José Iturbi Báguena (28 November 189528 June 1980) was a Spanish conductor, pianist and harpsichordist. He appeared in several Hollywood films of the 1940s, notably playing himself in the musicals Thousands Cheer (1943), Music for Millions (1944), Anchors Aweigh (1945), That Midnight Kiss (1949), and Three Daring Daughters (1948), his only leading role.

Biography
Born in Valencia, Spain, Iturbi showed a talent for classical music at an early age, and began musical studies there. He later moved to Paris in order to proceed with his studies with Victor Staub at the Paris Conservatory on a scholarship from the Diputació de Valencia. At this time, he also undertook studies in keyboard technique and interpretation with the harpsichordist Wanda Landowska. His worldwide concert tours, beginning around 1912, were very successful. He made his American debut in New York City in 1929.

Between 1911 and 1937, he was the frequent accompanist to the Spanish violinist Manuel Quiroga on his international tours. On 8 June 1937, he had just said goodbye to Quiroga after a concert in New York when the violinist was hit by a truck in Times Square, which led to the premature end of his career.

Iturbi made his first appearance as a conductor in Mexico City in 1933 when presented by impresario Ernesto de Quesada from Conciertos Daniel. In April 1936, Iturbi was injured in the crash and sinking of Pan American Airways' Puerto Rican Clipper in Port-of-Spain, Trinidad. After the incident, he said he would not be able to play "for some time", and "I may not be able to conduct again." Later that year, he was named conductor of the Rochester Philharmonic Orchestra in Rochester, New York, serving until 1944. He also led the Valencia Symphony Orchestra for many years.

He often appeared in concert with his sister, Amparo, also a renowned pianist. The liner notes to the two-record box set of Gershwin: Rhapsody in Blue (two-piano arrangements by José and Amparo Iturbi) read:
Arranged by José and Amparo Iturbi with the former conducting the RCA Victor Symphony Orchestra as well as playing one of the two solo parts ... The arrangers use the two pianos to thicken resonances and to invigorate what was purely orchestral tissue with the bony brittleness of the piano. ... The Iturbis perform this spirited work in a brilliant virtuoso fashion ...
Iturbi was also a noted harpsichordist and made several short instructional films using the re-emergent early 20th-century French Pleyel et Cie pedaled metal-framed harpsichord made famous by Wanda Landowska.

He appeared as an actor-performer in several filmed musicals of the 1940s, beginning with 1943's Thousands Cheer for MGM, accompanying Judy Garland, and in Three Daring Daughters in 1948, again playing himself, and starring with Jeanette MacDonald. He usually appeared as himself in these films. He later was featured in MGM's Anchors Aweigh, which starred Gene Kelly, Frank Sinatra and the soprano Kathryn Grayson, as well as in several other MGM movies. In the biopic about Frédéric Chopin, A Song to Remember, Iturbi's playing was used in the soundtrack in scenes where Cornel Wilde, as Chopin, was playing the piano.

Personal life
Iturbi married María Giner de los Santos in 1916; she died in 1928. They had one child, María. Iturbi's daughter married Stephan Hero, an American concert violinist who had been one of her father's protégés in 1936. They had two daughters, Maria Antonia and Maria Theresa, then separated in 1939. María Hero had obtained legal custody of the children in her 1941 divorce; her former husband had them for three months of each year.

In 1943, Iturbi took his daughter to court for custody of the girls, calling her unfit, according to The New York Times. In 1946, at age 28, Iturbi's daughter died by suicide. Hero absconded with his daughters while Iturbi was on a European concert tour in 1947. After a court battle of several months, Iturbi and his former son-in-law ultimately resolved their differences, and the girls remained with their father.

Iturbi's companion for many years was Marion Seabury, his secretary, who survived him and founded the José Iturbi Foundation after his death.

Death
José Iturbi continued his public performances into his 80s. He was ordered by his doctors to take a sabbatical in March 1980. He died on 28 June 1980, five days after being admitted to Cedars-Sinai Hospital for heart problems. He was 84 years old.

Legacy

Two music competitions have been established in Iturbi's name:
 the Valencia International Piano Competition Prize Iturbi commenced in 1981 and is often known as the José Iturbi International Piano Competition.
 the José Iturbi International Music Competition commenced in 2007 and awards prizes for pianists and opera singers.

The Philharmonic Concert Hall in Valencia is named after Jose Iturbi.

In popular culture
Iturbi is referenced in Philip Roth's bestselling Portnoy's Complaint, where the women in Portnoy's neighborhood call a talented young pianist "José Iturbi the Second". The pianist kills himself because of his overpowering mother and thus becomes a memento to the protagonist, who also has to deal with a dominant mother.

Cormac McCarthy honored Iturbi with a moment of colloquial humor in Suttree, his semi-autobiographical novel published in 1979. Conversing with his Aunt Martha on the topic of dogs once owned between himself and his ancestors, he proclaimed "We had one named Jose Iturbi. Because it was the peeinest dog."

One episode of the 1940s radio sitcom Amos 'n' Andy featured Iturbi unexpectedly getting a piano lesson from Andy Brown (who received a certificate from a correspondence school) and George "Kingfish" Stevens.

References

External links

 
 
 joseiturbi.com
 

1895 births
1980 deaths
Burials at Holy Cross Cemetery, Culver City
People from Valencia
Musicians from the Valencian Community
American people of Basque descent
Spanish conductors (music)
Male conductors (music)
Spanish classical pianists
Male classical pianists
Classical piano duos
José Iturbi International Piano Competition
Metro-Goldwyn-Mayer contract players
Spanish emigrants to the United States
20th-century conductors (music)
20th-century classical pianists
20th-century Spanish musicians
20th-century Spanish male musicians